Hradyzk is an urban-type settlement in Kremenchuk Raion of Poltava Oblast of Ukraine. Population: 

Hradyzk is also known as Horodyshche.

Gallery

References

External links
 Hradyzk at the Verkhovna Rada website

Urban-type settlements in Kremenchuk Raion
Kremenchugsky Uyezd
Populated places on the Dnieper in Ukraine